Lucía Topolansky Saavedra (born 25 September 1944) is a Uruguayan politician who served as the 17th Vice President of Uruguay from September 2017 to March 2020. She was a Senator from 2005 to 2017. She also served as the First Lady of Uruguay from 2010 to 2015.

Background 

During her childhood she studied in the College Sacré Cœur de las Hermanas Dominicas in Montevideo with her twin sister. She then entered the Instituto Alfredo Vásquez Acevedo where she was part of the guild of students.

She has been associated with the Movement of Popular Participation (MPP) for many years, linked with the former guerilla movement the Tupamaros.

She is of Polish noble ancestry on her father's side (Luis Topolansky).

She is married to José Mujica, who was the President of Uruguay from 2010 to 2015.

Political offices 

She served as a Representative for Montevideo from 2000 to 2005 and she subsequently became a Senator. In the 2009 election she received the highest number of votes for Senator as the leader of the 609 electoral list.

She was considered as a possible running mate for Tabaré Vázquez, the presidential candidate of the ruling coalition, in the 2014 elections.

Acting President of Uruguay 

On 26 November 2010, due to the absence of both President Mujica and Vice-President Danilo Astori, she became Acting President, making her the first woman to assume the Uruguay presidential powers and duties. This brief tenure as acting president lasted until 28 November 2010, when Vice President Astori returned to Uruguay.

This state of affairs came about because of a clause in the Uruguayan Constitution, which stipulates that the Presidential powers & duties passes temporarily to the leader of the largest elected grouping in the Upper House, if both the President and the Vice President are absent from the territory of the Republic.

Vice President of Uruguay 

Following the resignation of Raúl Fernando Sendic, after protracted series of controversies, she was appointed Vice President of Uruguay in Sendic's place on 13 September 2017.

See also 
 Politics of Uruguay
 List of political families#Uruguay

Bibliography

References 

1944 births
Living people
First Ladies of Uruguay
Uruguayan people of Polish descent
Movement of Popular Participation politicians
Broad Front (Uruguay) politicians
Members of the Chamber of Representatives of Uruguay
Members of the Senate of Uruguay
Politicians from Montevideo
Uruguayan twins
Uruguayan guerrillas
Uruguayan atheists
Women in war in South America
Women in warfare post-1945
21st-century Uruguayan women politicians
21st-century Uruguayan politicians
Vice presidents of Uruguay
Presidents of the Senate of Uruguay
José Mujica
Women vice presidents